Zinc finger protein 93 is a protein that in humans is encoded by the ZNF93 gene.

References

Further reading